To be distinguished from the United Brethren in England
The United Brethren were a group of former Primitive Methodists in Worcestershire, Gloucestershire  and Herefordshire, England, that converted en masse to the Church of Jesus Christ of Latter Day Saints in 1840.

In the mid-1830s, a group of approximately 600 Primitive Methodists led by Thomas Kington left the Primitive Methodism movement and established an independent religious organization, which they called the United Brethren. The church was divided into many small congregations scattered among the Three Counties, with 50 designated preachers for the group. In 1836, the United Brethren built the Gadfield Elm Chapel, near Ledbury.

In March 1840, Latter Day Saint missionary and apostle Wilford Woodruff was brought to Hill Farm, Fromes Hill by William Benbow, a recent English convert to Mormonism. Benbow introduced Woodruff to his brother John Benbow, who was a member of the United Brethren. Woodruff received permission to preach to United Brethren congregations, and in the first 30 days he had baptized 45 preachers and 160 members of the United Brethren into the Latter Day Saint church. By December 1840, 300 members of the church had been converted to Mormonism, and ultimately all the members of the United Brethren except one became Latter Day Saints. Woodruff and other Latter Day Saint missionaries also had success among the non-United Brethren in the area, baptizing a total of 1800 people by January 1841.

The United Brethren's Gadfield Elm Chapel was converted into a Latter Day Saint chapel, and today it is the oldest extant chapel of the Church of Jesus Christ of Latter-day Saints in the world.

Notes

References
James B. Allen, Ronald K. Esplin, and David J. Whittaker. Men with a Mission: The Quorum of the Twelve Apostles in the British Isles, 1837–1841. (Salt Lake City, Utah: Deseret Book, 1992)
James B. Allen and Malcolm R. Thorp, "The Mission of the Twelve To England, 1840–41: Mormon Apostles and the Working Classes", BYU Studies, vol. 15, no. 4 pp. 1–23 (Summer 1975) 
Richard L. Evans, "Wilford Woodruff and the United Brethren" in A Century of "Mormonism" in Great Britain (Salt Lake City, Utah: Deseret Book, 1937), reprinted 2007 by Kessinger Publishing, 
Tim B. Heaton, Stan L. Albrecht, and J. Randal Johnson, "The Making of British Saints in Historical Perspective", BYU Studies, vol. 27, no. 2, pp. 119–135 (Spring 1997)

External links

1830s establishments in England
1840 disestablishments in England
Organizations disestablished in 1840
United Brethren
 United Brethren
History of the Latter Day Saint movement
History of the Church of Jesus Christ of Latter-day Saints
History of Worcestershire
Methodism in England
Religious organizations established in the 1830s
Religion in Worcestershire
The Church of Jesus Christ of Latter-day Saints in England
Church of Christ (Latter Day Saints)